Raymond Mark Stein, MD, FRCSC, DABO, is a Canadian ophthalmologist. He practices refractive and cataract surgery. He is the medical director of the Bochner Eye Institute in Toronto, Ontario and Chief of Ophthalmology at the Scarborough General Hospital.

Education
Stein received his BA after attending Wharton School, University of Pennsylvania and McMaster University and was eventually designated a Benjamin Franklin Scholar. He then received his M.D. degree in 1982 from the University of Toronto Medical School, which was followed by ophthalmology residency at Mayo Clinic and fellowship training in cornea and external diseases at Wills Eye Hospital, Thomas Jefferson University. Stein was a member of the United States’ National Board of Medical Examiners, a diplomate of the American Board of Ophthalmology (DABO) and a Fellow of the Royal College of Physicians and Surgeons of Canada (FRCSC).

Career
Stein's primary work has been in laser vision correction, including the techniques of photorefractive keratectomy, LASIK, refractive lens exchange, cataract surgery, and implantable contact lenses. He has also done extensive research in corneal crosslinking and topography-guided PRK for keratoconus, procedures he introduced into Canada in 2008.

Stein is Associate Professor of Ophthalmology and Vision Sciences at University of Toronto and Medical Director of the Bochner Eye Institute in Toronto, Canada. He was trained by the inventor of the excimer laser, Dr Steven Trokel, in 1991 and has performed more than 150,000 vision-correction procedures.

He was chosen to serve as the chief eye surgeon for the W Network’s television show Style By Jury, and has performed surgery on over 25 episodes.  He has also appeared as a guest on the Marilyn Denis Show talking about laser eye surgery. He was described in a profile in Post City Magazines as "one of Canada’s top eye surgeons".

In addition to serving as the medical director of Bochner Eye Institute, Stein served as chief of ophthalmology at the Scarborough Hospital in Toronto, as well as the cornea consultant at the Mount Sinai Hospital, Toronto.
Stein's philanthropic activities include serving on the board of directors of the Foundation of Fighting Blindness, raising funds for Comic Vision for degenerative eye diseases, and volunteer surgeon on numerous international missions.

Awards
Stein received the Honor award from the American Academy of Ophthalmology for contributions to education of other eye surgeons. He was elected as a member of the International Intraocular Implant Club and given an honor award from the Contact Lens Association of Ophthalmologists. He has also received numerous international awards from Joint Commission in Allied Health Ophthalmology, International Society of Refractive Surgery and the American Society of Cataract and Refractive Society. Among his local and national awards are distinctions from Foundation Fighting Blindness and Mount Sinai Hospital. Stein served as the President of the Canadian Society of Cataract and Refractive Surgery.

Publications
Stein has published more than 100 articles, abstracts, and reports in professional journals and has delivered more than 300 lectures at international conferences. He also served as the Canadian editor of the peer-reviewed scientific journal, Clinical and Surgical Ophthalmology.

References

Canadian ophthalmologists
Wharton School of the University of Pennsylvania alumni
University of Toronto alumni
Academic staff of the University of Toronto
1956 births
Living people